The 1st Norwegian Biathlon Championships were held in Bærum, Akershus, Norway on 1 February 1959 at the stadium Løvenskioldbanen, arranged by Stor-Oslo Home Guard District 02. There was one scheduled competition: a 20 km individual race for men.

The race was affected by being held very early in the development of biathlon. Unlike the norm of the World Championships, and later the World Cup, the shoots were held at 3.5, 15, 18 and 20 kilometres, respectively. Additionally, each missed shot added two penalty minutes to the athletes' total time.

Schedule
All times are local (UTC+1).

Medal winners

Men

*This is the amount of misses, not minutes added; double amount of misses for minutes added.

References

Norwegian Biathlon Championships
1959 in biathlon
1959 in Norwegian sport